, also known as A Favor of Duty Part 1, is the first cover album by Japanese singer and songwriter Ringo Sheena, released on May 27, 2002 by Toshiba EMI. The album is a set of two discs. It has sold over 409,000 copies since its release and was certified Platinum by the RIAJ.

Background 
This album is Ringo Sheena's first work after her maternity leave of one year and two months. It wasn't clear whether she was going to return to the entertainment world, so Toshiba EMI intended to release her greatest hits album at first to fulfill the number of CDs in the contract term. Sheena herself said in a TV appearance: "I even thought that I would retire during my maternity leave," but she ended up deciding against that plan, so this cover album was released as a compromise.

The album consists of songs originally written by musicians that influenced Sheena until that point. Sheena usually writes her lyrics and music herself, but she devoted herself to being just "a singer" this time. She entrusted the arrangement to Seiji Kameda, who arranged her first and second album, and Toshiyuki Mori, who arranged her third album. She selected famous songs that had an influence on her and ordered them to arrange these songs in her own way.

Sheena parodied the names of the album's arrangers in the titles of the two discs; Kame-pact Disc and Mori-pact Disc. Kame-pact Disc was recorded in the garage rock style she used to record in earlier in her career because of a lack of budget. On Mori-pact Disc, a music sequencer is used and multitrack recording is adopted, which was also used on her third album.

The album jacket is designed by Sheena and Yumi Ota, an employee of Sheena's private office. Sheena was in charge of the photographs and illustrations in the booklet, and she designed the lettering with Ryosuke Nagaoka (Ukigmo). The model on the album cover is Hisako Tabuchi.

Four guest singers participated in each disc, all of which are acquaintances of Sheena. Masamune Kusano is from the same town as her, and he is a senior in her elder brother's high school. Nao Matsuzaki is a friend of Sheena. Hikaru Utada, another friend of Sheena, sang the same song with Sheena at the Toshiba EMI Party before, which was distributed in Japan by Napster. Junpei Shiina is her elder brother.

Sheena arranged one bonus track for each disc.

Track listing 

Notes:
"Haiiro no Hitomi" is Tokiko Kato and Kiyoshi Hasegawa's cover version of Uña Ramos' "Aquellos ojos grises."
"Chiisana Konomi" is adapted from the serenade in Bizet's opera La jolie fille de Perth.
"I Wanna Be Loved By You" is Marilyn Monroe's cover version of the song of the same name originally recorded by Helen Kane.
"Lullaby" contains an excerpt from Chopin's "Grande valse brillante" Op.34 No.2 in A minor.

Credits and personnel

Disc 1: Kame-pact Disc 

 Junji Yayoshi: electric guitar, acoustic guitar
 Seiji Kameda: electric bass guitar
 Makoto Minagawa: piano, organ, melodica, synthesizer, tambourine
 Masayuki Muraishi: drums, cowbell
 Nobuhiko Nakayama: music sequencer (tracks #2 and #3)
 Chieko Kinbara: strings (track #6)
Additional personnel 
 Masamune Kusano: guest vocals (track #1) 
 Nao Matsuzaki; guest vocals (track #7)
 several assistants: handclaps and footsteps (track #3)

Disc 2: Mori-pact Disc 

 Toshiyuki Mori: music sequencer, keyboard, bass synthesizer, electric guitar (track #1)
 Hitoshi Watanabe: double bass, electric bass guitar
 Takashi Numazawa: drums, tambourine
 Uni Inoue: finger snapping (track #3)
Additional personnel
 Hikaru Utada: guest vocals (track #4)
 Junpei Shiina; guest vocals (track #7)
 several others: finger snapping (track #3)

References 

Ringo Sheena albums
Covers albums
2002 albums
Albums produced by Seiji Kameda